The Amsterdam Student Rowing Club (ASR) Nereus, (Dutch De Amsterdamsche Studenten Roeivereeniging (ASR) Nereus) is a rowing club in Amsterdam, Netherlands which was founded in 1885 by J. Schölvinck as a subsidiary organization of The Corps, an Amsterdam student fraternity. 

Within a short period of time, Nereus started proving itself by achieving big successes and winning its first event in 1888 followed by a winning streak of four Varsity victories 1891–1894. After obtaining national recognition, Nereus finally made its mark on the international rowing scene by winning at Hamburg in 1891 and by winning the Thames Challenge Cup at Henley Royal Regatta in 1895. 

Nereus has provided rowers for the Netherlands' national Olympic crews, of which the golden men's eight in Atlanta (1996), the silver quad in Sydney (2000), the silver men's eight, bronze lightweight women's double and women's eight in Athens (2004) are examples. At the Beijing Olympics (2008), as well as the Rio de Janeiro Olympics (2016),, Nereus lightweight women's double won the gold medal. One of the more notable members of Nereus is head coach Diederik Simon who has won two silver medals at the 2000 Sydney games and 2004 Athens games. Simon's most prestigious achievements come from his 1996 Gold in the men's eight at the  1996 Atlanta  games, and his wins in the Oude Vier or Old four at the Varsity (rowing regatta). Other Notable members include Tone Wieten who currently holds the RowPerfect 2-kilometre world record with a time of five minutes and thirty-three seconds, Robert Lücken, and Boaz Meylink.

Nereus has won the most prestigious and oldest student rowing event of The Netherlands, The Varsity, which is modelled after the Oxford and Cambridge Boat Race, a total of 43 times. 

The club's first boathouse was built in 1886 along the River Amstel. It was situated closer to the centre of Amsterdam than the present one. The old boathouse was demolished during the Second World War.  The current boathouse was opened in 1953. A miniature version of the Nereus boathouse can be found in Madurodam.

Membership of Nereus was originally confined to members of The Amsterdam Student Corps, also the ‘Corps’. Changes in Dutch society in the 1970s and decreasing membership levels caused Nereus to welcome non-Corps members as well as merging with its female counterpart Thetis.

Nereus celebrated its 26th lustrum on its 130th dies natalis on December 11, 2015.

Honours

Henley Royal Regatta

External links
A.S.R. Nereus official website
Boathouse at Madurodam

Sports clubs established in 1885
Boathouses
Sports clubs in Amsterdam
Rowing clubs in the Netherlands
1885 establishments in the Netherlands